Shadmoor State Park is a  state park located in Suffolk County, New York in the United States.

History
Prior to becoming a park, the land was used as part of the coastal defense system for New York City during World War II. Two concrete observation bunkers from that time remain visible at the site. It was also part of Camp Wikoff where troops led by Theodore Roosevelt were quarantined after the Spanish–American War.

Attempts to purchase the land to preserve it as a public park had been ongoing for years prior to the park's creation in 2000. After the previous owners won approval to subdivide their property into several residential lots, preservation efforts intensified. The parkland was purchased in October 2000 for $17.7 million, with the cost split between New York State ($5.6 million), the Town of East Hampton ($5.5 million), Suffolk County ($5.4 million), and The Nature Conservancy ($1 million).

Park description
The park is largely undeveloped, and has no infrastructure beyond elevated platforms for birdwatching and trails for hiking, biking, and cross-country skiing. The park also offers accessibility for salt water fishing.

Shadmoor State Park derives its name from the thick shadbush (Amelanchier) found growing atop the bluffs. Also found growing in the park are black cherry trees (Prunus serotina) and the endangered sandplain gerardia (Agalinis acuta).

See also
 List of New York state parks

References

External links
 New York State Parks: Shadmoor State Park
 Shadmoor State Park trail map

State parks of New York (state)
East Hampton (town), New York
Parks in Suffolk County, New York